The Museum of the Shenandoah Valley is located at 901 Amherst Street, Winchester, Virginia. The Museum endeavours to preserve and enrich the cultural life and heritage of the Valley. Located on the largest green space in the city of Winchester, the MSV is a regional cultural center including a museum designed by Driehaus Prize winner Michael Graves, seven acres of formal gardens, and the Glen Burnie House dating to the 18th century.

The MSV complex consists of three main components:

House

The Glen Burnie Historic House traces its history to surveyor James Wood (?-1759), who settled this land in the early 18th century and donated portions of his land to establish the city of Winchester, Virginia in 1744. His son Robert Wood constructed the central portion of the Glen Burnie Historic House in the 1790s. The house’s ownership passed through several generations of Wood and then Glass families until Julian Wood Glass Jr. (1910–1992), acquired it in 1955. Julian Wood Glass Jr. was the last descendant of James Wood to own the Glen Burnie Historic House.

Beginning in 1959, and aided by his partner R. Lee Taylor, Glass transformed the house into a country estate, and the couple designed the Glen Burnie Gardens. Glass created the Glass-Glen Burnie Foundation prior to his death in 1992, and entrusted the Foundation to open the site to the public as a museum. The Glen Burnie Historic House & Gardens opened to the public in 1998.

Today, interpretive panels tell the story of those who lived in the house from 1796 to 1992 and exhibitions are presented annually in the Drawing Room.

The house is listed on the National Register of Historic Places and the Virginia Landmarks Register.

Gardens

The gardens surrounding the Glen Burnie Historic House were created beginning in 1956 and evolved over the latter half of the 20th century. Built for formal entertaining, the gardens include sculpture, fountains, and folly buildings. Highlights include rose, statue, vegetable, Asian, and perennial gardens. The pond in the Water Garden is stocked with golden trout.

Museum

The Museum of the Shenandoah Valley was designed by architect Michael Graves and opened to the public in 2005. The Museum contains four main galleries:

Shenandoah Valley Gallery
The broad sweep of Valley prehistory and history is explored in the museum's large Shenandoah Valley Gallery. A number of different exhibition techniques are used here, including multi-media presentations, interactive elements, images, maps, dioramas, and display of decorative arts. Objects on display include furniture, fraktur, silver and other metals, baskets, textiles, paintings, folk art, long rifles, and ceramics, for which the Valley is famous.

Founders Gallery
Presents changing exhibitions including, or relating to, the private collection of MSV benefactor, Julian Wood Glass Jr.

R. Lee Taylor Miniatures Gallery
This gallery presents an outstanding collection of furnished miniature houses and rooms by R. Lee Taylor (1924–2000), who lived at Glen Burnie from the late 1950s until his death. At the time of his death, Taylor had assembled fourteen completely furnished rooms and houses. On display are five houses and four rooms by R. Lee Taylor showcasing the work of more than seventy-five miniatures artisans. Also on display are four shadowboxes by the late Valley miniatures artist William P. Massey, who created his work between the 1930s to 1940s.

Changing Exhibitions Gallery
Several temporary exhibitions are presented throughout the year.

Notes

External links

 Museum of the Shenandoah Valley

Art museums and galleries in Virginia
Museum of the Shenandoah Valley
Museums in Winchester, Virginia
Historic house museums in Virginia
History museums in Virginia
Museum of the Shenandoah Valley
Museum of the Shenandoah Valley
Museums established in 2005
Museum of the Shenandoah Valley
New Classical architecture